Alcetas (died 320 BC) was a Macedonian general.

Alcetas, Alcetes or Alketas may also refer to:

Ancient period
Alcetas I of Macedon (576–547 BC)
Alcetas II of Macedon (454–448 BC)
Alcetas I of Epirus (390/385–370 BC)
Alcetas II of Epirus (313–306 ВС)

Modern period
Alketas Panagoulias (1934–2012), Greek footballer and coach
Alketas of Alexandreia, Greek athletic team

See also